Girella fimbriata, the caramel drummer, is a species of sea chub endemic to the waters around the Kermadec Islands on reefs at a depth of about .  This species can reach a length of  TL.

References

fimbriata
Endemic marine fish of New Zealand
Fauna of the Kermadec Islands
Taxa named by Allan Riverstone McCulloch
Fish described in 1920